Detlef Richter (born 6 June 1956 in Leipzig, Saxony) is an East German bobsledder who competed from the late 1970s to the late 1980s. He won a bronze medal in the four-man event at the 1980 Winter Olympics in Lake Placid.

Richter also won five medals at the FIBT World Championships with three silvers (Two-man: 1985, Four-man: 1979, 1985) and two bronzes (Two-man: 1986, Four-man: 1983).

His best Bobsleigh World Cup finish was second in 1988–89, both in the combined men's and two-man events.

References
 Bobsleigh two-man world championship medalists since 1931
 Bobsleigh four-man world championship medalists since 1930
 DatabaseOlympics.com profile
 List of combined men's bobsleigh World Cup champions: 1985–2007
 List of two-man bobsleigh World Cup champions since 1985

1956 births
Living people
Sportspeople from Leipzig
German male bobsledders
Bobsledders at the 1988 Winter Olympics
Bobsledders at the 1980 Winter Olympics
Olympic bobsledders of East Germany
Olympic bronze medalists for East Germany
Olympic medalists in bobsleigh
Medalists at the 1980 Winter Olympics